Lanka Hospital (formerly Apollo Hospital Sri Lanka)  is multi-speciality tertiary care hospital in Sri Lanka and is one of the largest private hospitals in the country. That is a subsidiary of Sri Lanka Insurance Corporation. The company's previously owned by Apollo Hospitals. It was founded by Dr Pratap C. Reddy in India. It is situated on Elvitigala Mawatha, also known as Baseline Road, which is a direct route from Colombo's international airport. It is also only a few minutes drive from central Colombo. The hospital was commissioned in 2002 as a branch of Apollo Hospitals India. The hospital was taken over by Sri Lanka Insurance in 2006. In 2009, it was renamed Lanka Hospitals after it ended a licensing and support services agreement with Apollo Hospitals.

There are approximately 350 beds at the hospital including four intensive care units (medical, cardiothoracic, renal and neonatal). The wards are divided into either individual rooms or cubicles with six beds each, depending on the patients’ choice.

References

External links 
 

Companies listed on the Colombo Stock Exchange
Hospital buildings completed in 2002
Hospitals established in 2002
Health care companies of Sri Lanka
Private hospitals in Sri Lanka
2002 establishments in Sri Lanka
Hospitals in Colombo